The Pader is a river in North Rhine-Westphalia, Germany, left tributary of the Lippe. It runs through the city of Paderborn, which it gave its name. Although fairly wide, it is only  in length which makes it the shortest river this size of Germany.

The Pader receives its water from six source rivers, each resulting from a karstic spring in the centre of Paderborn: the Maspernpader, the Dielenpader, the Rothobornpader, the Börnepader, the Dammpader and the Warme Pader.

See also
 List of rivers of North Rhine-Westphalia

References

Paderborn
Rivers of North Rhine-Westphalia
Rivers of Germany